Leones is a corregimiento in Las Minas District, Herrera Province, Panama with a population of 852 as of 2010. Its population as of 1990 was 1,193; its population as of 2000 was 941.

References

Corregimientos of Herrera Province